The viceroys of Peru ruled the Viceroyalty of Peru from 1544 to 1824 in the name of the monarch of Spain. The territories under de jure rule by the viceroys included in the 16th and 17th century almost all of South America except eastern Brazil.

Governors of New Castile (1532–1544)

Viceroys of Peru (1544–1824)

See also
Viceroyalty of Peru
History of Peru
List of presidents of Peru

References

 
Viceroyalty of Peru

Peru
Colonial Peru
Viceroy
Peru, viceroys
Viceroys
16th-century Peruvian people
17th-century Peruvian people
18th-century Peruvian people
19th-century Peruvian people
Viceroy of Peru
Viceroy of Peru
Viceroy of Peru
Viceroy of Peru
Viceroy of Peru
Viceroy of Peru